Ectenessa guttigera is a species of beetle in the family Cerambycidae. It was described by Hippolyte Lucas in 1857.

The larvae of this beetle usually drill into wood and can cause damage to live logs or wood that has been felled.

References

Ectenessini
Beetles described in 1857